Sir Maurice Drummond Peterson GCMG (10 March 1889 – 15 March 1952) was a British diplomat who was minister or ambassador to several countries.

Career
Maurice Drummond Peterson was the younger son of William Peterson (later Sir William Peterson, Principal of University College, Dundee and later McGill University). He was educated at Rugby School and Magdalen College, Oxford, where he gained a first class degree in modern history. He entered the Foreign Office in 1913 and served at Washington, Prague, Tokyo, Cairo and Madrid before being attached to the British delegation to the Washington Naval Conference between October 1921 and February 1922 as private secretary to Arthur Balfour. He was head of the Egyptian department in the Foreign Office 1931–1936 including four months in Cairo in 1934 as acting High Commissioner (during the absence of Sir Miles Lampson) when he was instrumental in resolving a political dispute in the Egyptian government which resulted in the resignation of the Prime Minister, Abdel Fattah Yahya Ibrahim Pasha.

Peterson was Minister to Bulgaria 1936–38. In March 1938 he was appointed to be "His Majesty's Ambassador Extraordinary and Plenipotentiary at Bagdad" but this was quickly corrected to "His Majesty's Ambassador Extraordinary and Plenipotentiary to His Majesty the King of Iraq." However, he remained in Iraq only until March 1939 when he was appointed ambassador to Spain, then under the regime of Francisco Franco. In the early days of the 1939–45 war he defended British interests with such persistence that he was officially congratulated by the then Foreign Secretary, Lord Halifax, yet in June 1940 he was recalled to London and served as Controller of Overseas Publicity in the Ministry of Information 1940–41 and as head of the Egyptian, eastern and far eastern departments of the Foreign Office 1942–44.

Peterson was Ambassador to Turkey 1944–46 and finally Ambassador to the Soviet Union 1946–49. In 1949 he retired from the Diplomatic Service due to illness, and was subsequently a director of Midland Bank.

Publications
 Both sides of the curtain: an autobiography, Constable, London, 1950

Honours
Maurice Peterson was appointed CMG in 1933, knighted KCMG in 1938 on his appointment to Iraq, and promoted GCMG in the New Year Honours of 1947.

Offices held

References
 PETERSON, Sir Maurice Drummond, Who Was Who, A & C Black, 1920–2008; online edn, Oxford University Press, Dec 2007. Retrieved 19 July 2012
 Victor Rothwell, Peterson, Sir Maurice Drummond (1889–1952), Oxford Dictionary of National Biography, Oxford University Press, 2004; online edn, Jan 2011. Retrieved 19 July 2012
 Ancestors of Sir Maurice Drummond Peterson GCMG

External links
 

1889 births
1952 deaths
People educated at Rugby School
Alumni of Magdalen College, Oxford
Ambassadors of the United Kingdom to Bulgaria
Ambassadors of the United Kingdom to Iraq
Ambassadors of the United Kingdom to Spain
Ambassadors of the United Kingdom to Turkey
Ambassadors of the United Kingdom to the Soviet Union
Knights Grand Cross of the Order of St Michael and St George